Cooks Run is a tributary of the Neshaminy Creek.

History
Cooks Run is named after Arthur Cooke, a large landowner in Bucks County in the late 17th century. The stream supplied power for three mills, Hisand's near Doylestown, Godshalk's in New Britain, and Landis' near its mouth at the Neshaminy once known as Kepharts and Godshalks Dam.

Statistics
The Geographic Name Information System I.D. is 1172392, U.S. Department of the Interior Geological Survey I.D. is 02776. The Cooks Run watershed, which is approximately 3.3 square miles in size, is located in central Bucks County. Cooks Run flows in a southwesterly direction and discharges into the Neshaminy Creek, which in turn flows into the Delaware River. Currently, Cooks Run is classified as Warmwater Fishery (WWF), MF (Migratory Fishery) under PA DEP's Chapter 93 Water Quality Standards. Both the Neshaminy Creek and Cooks Run are listed on the State's 303(d) List of Impaired Waters.

Course

Cooks Run rises adjacent to the Pennsylvania Route 611 bypass near the current location of Doylestown Hospital and runs generally southwest to its confluence at Neshaminy Creek and Miller Point at the Wilma Quinlan Nature Preserve.

Municipalities
Bucks County
New Britain
Doylestown Township

Crossings and Bridges

See also
List of rivers of Pennsylvania
List of rivers of the United States
List of Delaware River tributaries

References

Rivers of Bucks County, Pennsylvania
Rivers of Pennsylvania
Tributaries of the Neshaminy Creek